is a role playing game published by Taito for the Family Computer. It is the first game in the Minelvaton series, being followed by Silva Saga and ending with Silva Saga II: The Legend of Light and Darkness.

A tribute CD Minelvaton Saga Tribute was published in 2009.

Plot
Minelvaton Saga takes place on the world Minelvaton, in the area known as Southern Ofelia. In the kingdom of Palmeccia both the King and Queen have been murdered by the hands of a servant of Ragon, son of the Zuhl. The player takes control of the Prince of Palmeccia in a quest for revenge and to kill the evil Ragon.

Gameplay 
In the first few minutes of gameplay, Minelvaton Saga plays and looks like Dragon Quest: an open-world role-playing game with top-down perspective. As soon as a battle starts, though, the fundamental difference becomes apparent: Minelvaton Saga is an action-based RPG, while Dragon Quest is a turn-based RPG. However, the two sequels Silva Saga I and II feature turn-based combat.

The player is given control of a single character and can explore a number of towns, dungeons, and the world surface itself. Once the player receives the ship for sailing, the game world becomes truly open, as the player can explore almost anywhere that can be reached.

Like a typical role-playing game, there are random battles, but actual combat is action-based. In battle, the player starts at the bottom of the screen facing the enemies that are at the top. In order to defeat enemies, the player must run into one in order to exchange blows. This system was already used in other early series of Japanese role-playing games, e.g. Xanadu: Dragon Slayer II and the Ys series.

Beyond that, the basic plot and some of the battle system concept seems to have been co-opted by Sega's Sword of Vermilion.

Credits
Writer?: Ramon Yūto
Design Works (Illustrator?): Hitoshi Yoneda
Music: Yō Ōyama (leader of the progressive rock band ASTURIAS), Haruhiko Tsuda (guitarist of Shingetsu)

Legacy
Although never released outside Japan, the game was fan translated to English in 2011.

References

External links
Minelvaton Saga at Giant Bomb

1987 video games
Japan-exclusive video games
Nintendo Entertainment System games
Nintendo Entertainment System-only games
Role-playing video games
Taito games
Video games developed in Japan